Gondar Airport , also known as Atse Tewodros Airport, is an airport serving Gondar, a city in the northern Amhara Region of Ethiopia. The name of the city and airport may also be transliterated as Gonder. The airport is named after the Emperor of Ethiopia (Atse) Tewodros II.

Facilities 

Airlines and destinations

References

External links 

 

Airports in Ethiopia
Amhara Region
Buildings and structures in Gondar